Liquid Loft is an internationally active dance company based in Vienna, Austria. It was jointly founded in 2005 by the choreographer Chris Haring, the dancer Stephanie Cumming, the musician Andreas Berger and the dramaturge .

Performances 
Liquid Loft create stage performances and installations at the intersection of contemporary dance and visual arts, with the sound environment and musical composition playing an integral part of the creative development. In 2007 Liquid Loft was awarded the Golden Lion for “Best Performance” for the piece “Posing Project B – The Art of Seduction” at the Biennale di Venezia. Science Fiction and the reception of cyborg theory count as the major sources of inspiration for their work. In their performances Liquid Loft reflect, among other things, on the change in our perception through visual media and the everyday use of technology.

Collaborations  
Part of Liquid Loft’s Oeuvre forms, amongst other, choreographies for Dialogue Dance Kostroma, RU (Groza, 2012), Phace Ensemble for contemporary music, Vienna & Arturo Fuentes (Grace Note, 2012), Staatstheater Kassel (Lego Love, 2013), Ballet Moskau (Frozen Laugh 2014), Balletto di Roma (Giselle, 2014). Collaborations on various pieces, for example with visual artists such as Erwin Wurm (Kind of Heroes), Aldo Giannotti (Posing Project, Wintersonne, etc.) and Günter Brus (Grace Note).

Installations 
Together with visual artist Michel Blazy location specific installations were created for the series „The Perfect Garden“, among others at Hof Dietrichsruh, Salzburg and at the Palmenhaus at Vienna’s Burggarten. The installation Posing Project C – The Art of Garfunkel was shown at Künstlerhaus Vienna.

Film 
There are four short films and one feature length movie, based on Liquid Loft pieces, created in cooperation with filmmaker Mara Mattuschka: “Legal Errorist (2004), Part Time Heroes (2007), Running Sushi (2008), Burning Palace (2009) and Perfect Garden (2010).

Awards 
 2004 Award for best performance at the Biennale de la Dance Lyon, with “Fremdkoerper”
 2010 outstanding artist award – Darstellende Kunst, Bundesministerium für Unterricht, Kunst und Kultur for Chris Haring.

Literature 
 Andrea Amort, Mimi Wunderer-Gosch (Hrsg.): Österreich tanzt. Geschichte und Gegenwart. Böhlau-Verlag, Wien 2001, .
 Kim Knowles: Film, Performance, and the Spaces Between: The Collaborative Works of Mara Mattuschka and Chris Haring (forthcoming)
 Elena Basteri u.a.: REGEARSING COLLECTIVITY – Choreography Beyond Dance. Berlin 2012, .
 Kreitner Angelika: Der Begriff der Gemeinschaft im Postdramatischen Theater. Diplomarbeit, Universität Wien, Wien 2010.
 Dettelbacher, Christina: Produktionsbedingungen der Freien Zeitgenössischen Tanzszene im Wien der Gegenwart. Magisterarbeit, Ludwig-Maximilians-Universität, München 2013.

References

External links 
 Official website

Contemporary dance companies